Marcos Antônio de Araújo, 2nd Baron of Itajubá (Hamburg, 8 February 1842 – Berlin, 3 November 1897) was a Brazilian jurist and diplomat. He was the son of Marcos Antônio de Araújo, Viscount of Itajubá.

He began his career as professor of law at the Federal University of Pernambuco before becoming Consul General in Hamburg and later the second Ambassador in Hanover, Copenhagen, Berlin and finally in Paris.

He was a member of the tribunal convened to arbitrate in the Alabama claims.

References

External links
Der Fall Alabama Genf 1872 (in German)

Brazilian diplomats
Ambassadors of Brazil to Denmark
Ambassadors of Brazil to Germany
Ambassadors of Brazil to France
19th-century Brazilian lawyers
Brazilian nobility
1842 births
1897 deaths